The 2007 NRL season consisted of 25 weekly regular season rounds, starting from 16 March and ending on 2 September, followed by four weeks of play-offs that culminated in a grand final on 30 September.

All times in fixture listings are Australian Eastern Standard Time.

Round 1 
 Bulldogs' forward Sonny Bill Williams was sent off in the fourth minute of his 2007 season in the match against Newcastle, having made a hit on Newcastle captain Andrew Johns which was deemed to be a reckless high tackle. Williams pleaded guilty at the judiciary, and received a two-week suspension.
 A number of high-profile players were injured in this round, including Newcastle's Andrew Johns, Manly's Steve Menzies, Matt Orford and Steve Matai, and Brisbane's Darren Lockyer.
 Penrith were held scoreless for the first time since Round 18, 1999.
 A total 185,051 people witnessed these eight matches, making this the round with the highest total attendance in the history of the competition (previous record was 171,526 for Round 22, 1995).

Round 2 
 South Sydney recorded two victories to open the season – the first time they have done so since being reinstated into the competition earlier in the decade.
 The New Zealand Warriors defeated the premiers from season 2006, Brisbane. This victory marks the first time in the club's history that the Warriors have won the first two games of a season.
 The Gold Coast Titans recorded their maiden victory, defeating the Cronulla Sharks.

Round 3 
 Both Friday night games went into golden point extra time, with Penrith winning by one point and Parramatta winning by two points. It was just the 2nd time there were 2 Golden Point games on the same day, the other occasion was Round 19 2004 on the Sunday afternoon.
 The Roosters lost their third match in as many rounds, marking the club's worst start to a season since 1994.
 Broncos player, Justin Hodges, found himself in the rare situation of scoring 4 tries (equal club record) for a losing side.
 The Broncos also recorded their worst start to a season since 1999, and the worst start to a season by a defending premier since 2000.
 Contrastingly, Souths continued with their third straight win, the Rabbitohs' best start to a season since 1972.
 The Canberra Raiders, who were listed as wooden spoon favourites by numerous betting organisations, pulled out a 30-point trashing of Newcastle with young back, William Zillman scoring a hat-trick of tries.

Round 4 
 Australia's Channel 9's televised game of South Sydney vs Bulldogs was the first time Souths had a prime-time televised Friday night match since 2002. The 34,315 crowd was a record at Telstra Stadium, and the highest for a regular season game in Sydney since Round 1, 2002 (when South Sydney were readmitted into the competition).
 Cronulla's winning margin of 36 over the St George Illawarra was Cronulla's highest against that club or its predecessors.
 South Sydney co-captain and kiwi international David Kidwell tore ligaments in his knee during the weekend at a family barbecue, an injury which ended Kidwell's season.

Round 5 
 On Tuesday 10 April, Newcastle halfback, Andrew Johns announced his retirement from rugby league because of a bulging disc in his neck.
 Bulldogs winger, Hazem El Masri played in his 250th first-grade match for the club.
 The Manly Warringah Sea Eagles remained undefeated after their win over the Bulldogs and marked the best start to a season by the club since 1997.
 A penalty try was awarded to the Cronulla Sharks in the club's golden-point loss to the Wests Tigers, the first time a penalty try had been awarded since Round 26 in the 2005 season.

Round 6 
 Newcastle held special farewell celebrations for Andrew Johns in the home game against Brisbane, renaming the East grandstand of EnergyAustralia Stadium the "Andrew Johns Stand". In addition, in a first for the NRL, his number 7 jersey was retired for the match with half back Jarred Mullen wearing number 18.
 The Gold Coast Titans were fined $5,000 after coach John Cartwright and football manager Scott Sattler approached the video referee during the team's loss to the Manly Warringah Sea Eagles.

Round 7 
 After their worst start to a season since 1994 the Sydney Roosters became the last team to win a game in the 2007 season, beating the St George Illawarra Dragons on the traditional ANZAC day match on Wednesday. It was the 1,000th win in the club's history, the first club to achieve the milestone.
 In a re-match between the two teams of the 2006 grand final, the Melbourne Storm defeated the Brisbane Broncos, leaving the Storm as the only remaining undefeated team in 2007.
 Two South Sydney players reached significant career milestones: David Peachey played his 250th first grade game, and captain Peter Cusack played his 150th game.
 Daniel Wagon played his 200th game for the Parramatta Eels.

Round 8 
 Melbourne lost its first game of the season, meaning every team had won and lost at least 1 game.

Round 9

Round 10 
 After losing their first four matches of the season the Wests Tigers defeated the New Zealand Warriors in an unbeaten run of five wins.
 Eels fullback Luke Burt scored a personal tally of 24 points against the Cowboys to notch up his 900th career point, and a record of 500 points at Parramatta Stadium, the first player to reach this milestone.

Round 11 
 The Brisbane Broncos recorded their highest score and largest win in their history, defeating the Newcastle Knights 71–6. This match was Newcastle's biggest loss and set a club record for the most points conceded. Brisbane had been sitting last on the ladder on the day of the match.

Round 12 
 Penrith and St George Illawarra recorded upset wins over competition leaders Manly and defending premiers Brisbane respectively.
 Warriors winger Michael Crockett was dismissed after just four minutes in the home team's 40–20 loss to the Bulldogs for a high tackle.
 Wests Tigers five-game winning streak was brought to an end, when they lost to the Parramatta Eels 8–38.
 Wests Tigers fullback Brett Hodgson suffered a fractured eye socket after a headclash with Parramatta Eels utility PJ Marsh, which saw him miss two months of football.

Round 13 
 Heavy storms across areas of New South Wales affected games and attendances throughout the round. The Friday night match at Telstra Stadium was played in a constant, heavy shower of rain. The match played in Newcastle was under threat of cancellation for much of Sunday morning after 300mm of rain had fallen in the area within four days. Many lower grade NSWRL matches were postponed to preserve grounds for first grade matches.
 The Canberra Raiders scored four tries in the opening 12 minutes on their way to a 38–10 win over the Parramatta Eels.
 The last-placed Sydney Roosters achieved their highest score since 1935 in their 64–30 win over the North Queensland Cowboys.
 In the New Zealand Warriors' 300th game, the Warriors suffered their sixth straight loss, losing 4–2 against competition leaders the Melbourne Storm. The scoreline was 2–0 to New Zealand until the 72nd minute, when a decisive try sealed the match for Melbourne. It was the lowest aggregate score (six points total) since 1993.

Round 14 
 The New Zealand Warriors won their first match since round seven, ending a six-game losing run by beating the Cronulla Sharks 2–12 on a rainy night at Toyota Park.
 Danny Buderus played his 200th game for the Newcastle Knights.
 Parramatta second rower Nathan Hindmarsh played his 200th first grade game for the Parramatta Eels and was given a guard of honour at the end of the match.
 Melbourne Storm veteran winger Matt Geyer scored his 100th career try.

Round 15 
 Manly lost its first match at home after a 10-match winning streak.
 The Melbourne Storm celebrated its 10-year anniversary with a 28–6 victory over the Dragons. The Storm's weekend long celebrations started with the naming of its team of the decade.

Round 16 
 South Sydney defeated Newcastle at Energy Australia Stadium. It was Souths' first win at this venue since 1994.

Round 17 
 Following Round 17, Aussie Stadium's naming rights deal expired, with the name reverting to the Sydney Football Stadium on 8 July.
 On 9 July Sydney Roosters coach Chris Anderson resigned from the club, handing the role to former club great Brad Fittler.

Round 18 
 Brisbane Broncos five-eighth Darren Lockyer suffered a knee injury, requiring a reconstruction which saw him miss nine months. Bulldogs forward Willie Mason also suffered a season ending wrist injury.
 The Gold Coast Titans suffered their worst ever loss, going down to Canberra 56–10.
 There was an argument between Parramatta coach Michael Hagan and South Sydney coach Jason Taylor after their teams' match. It is alleged Taylor said "Brian Smith (former Eels coach) fixed up what Hagan at Newcastle." Taylor also said that Hagan had ruined what had been put in place at the Eels.

Round 19

Round 20

Round 21 
 The Bulldogs' Brad Morrin was cited for biting Parramatta's Timana Tahu. He was suspended for eight weeks for the incident.

Round 22 
 Cronulla Sharks coach Ricky Stuart allegedly punched a hole into the wall of the Parramatta Stadium coaches box, in spite of a win over the Eels 25–24.
 Bulldogs forward Sonny Bill Williams scored three tries in his team's win against Canberra Raiders.

Round 23 
 The Sydney Roosters suffered their first defeat under caretaker coach Brad Fittler.

Round 24 
 This round was the first instance in the 100 years of the competition where two separate matches were sold out. For the first time in its history, Mt Smart Stadium held a sold-out game, and Leichhardt Oval was also sold out.
 The Melbourne Storm captured the Minor Premiership for the second consecutive season (although the title was later stripped).
 The Warriors made the Finals Series for the first time since 2003.

Round 25 
 The NRL scrapped Monday Night Football and moved the Melbourne Storm vs Gold Coast Titans match to the Sunday night before, to ensure that the teams would not have a short turnaround before a finals match.
 The Newcastle Knights win against the Wests Tigers saw the Knights move out of last place, giving Penrith the wooden spoon; and, it saw the Brisbane Broncos replace the Wests Tigers in the final eight.
 The South Sydney Rabbitohs clinched a finals appearance for the first time since 1989.
 The Brisbane Broncos conceded 68 points against Parramatta, the most in club history.

Finals series 
 The 2007 Finals Series was based on the McIntyre format. For the first time, teams based outside of Sydney were permitted to host finals matches in weeks two and three in their own cities; previously, all matches after the first week were played at either the SFS or Telstra Stadium. The 2007 Grand Final was played at Telstra Stadium.
 All rounds in the finals series were shown live in Australia on Channel 9, with the exception of the Warriors v Parramatta qualifying final in week one, which was shown as a delayed telecast due to the time difference between New Zealand and eastern Australia.

Week One

First Qualifying Final

Second Qualifying Final

Third Qualifying Final

Fourth Qualifying Final

Week Two

First Semi-Final

Second Semi-Final

Week Three

First Preliminary Final

Second Preliminary Final

Grand Final

See also 
 2007 in rugby league

References 

Results
National Rugby League season results